Salem Reporter is a digital news service based in Salem, Oregon. It was launched in September 2018 by longtime investigative journalist Les Zaitz, with investment from businessman Larry Tokarski, president of a real estate development firm. Its primary revenue source is from reader subscriptions, which cost $10/month. The site aims to distinguish itself from its competitors with the quality and credibility of its reporting. According to local news scholar Damian Radcliffe, the Reporter's freedom from the legacy costs that a traditional newspaper like the Statesman Journal has allowed it to enter the field with unusual agility.

Shortly after its launch, the Salem Reporter joined the Pamplin Media Group and the EO Media Group in a partnership named the Oregon Capital Bureau. The bureau was formed by the original partners 2014, to provide its constituent newspapers with reporting on state government; it produces a newsletter called the Oregon Capital Insider. Zaitz leads the bureau's team of three reporters.

Zaitz, a renowned investigative reporter for The Oregonian who, upon his retirement, bought and revitalized the Malheur Enterprise several years prior, is motivated by a desire to create "a new financial paradigm for the newspaper that can be replicated and scaled up." In speeches in 2018, Zaitz has emphasized restoring trust in media as a top priority for the journalism industry.

References

External links 
 Official web site

Newspapers published in Oregon
Salem, Oregon
2018 establishments in Oregon